The European Taekwondo Championships in Olympic Weight Categories are the European senior championships in Taekwondo in olympic weight categories, first held in Nalchik in 2015. The event is held annually and is organized by the European Taekwondo Union, the continental affiliate of World Taekwondo. This event is ranked as a G-1 tournament while the main European Championships are ranked as a G-4 tournament.

The championships should not be confused with:

 the European Taekwondo Championships, the main continental event, and ranked as a G-4 by World Taekwondo.
 the European Games taekwondo competitions, which form part of a continental multi-sport event in the Olympic tradition;
 the EITF European Taekwondo Championships, a championships organised by the European International Taekwondo Federation, the continental arm of the International Taekwondo Federation.

List of championships

Medal summary
All results from 2015 - 2020:

See also 
 European Taekwondo Championships
 European Juniors Taekwondo Championships
 European Universities Taekwondo Championships

References

External links 

 Official site of the European Taekwondo Union

olympic
Taekwondo competitions
Taekwondo
Taekwondo in Europe
Recurring sporting events established in 2015
Annual sporting events
Taekwondo weight classes